The Men's team foil event of the 2015 World Fencing Championships was held on 18–19 July 2015.

Medalists

Draw

Finals

Top half

Bottom half

Placement rounds

5–8th place

9–16th place

13–16th place

Final classification

References
 Bracket

2015 World Fencing Championships